Robin Cooper may refer to:

 Robert Popper, writer with the pseudonym Robin Cooper
 Robin Cooper (politician), Australian politician
 Robin Cooper (American football), American football coach